Des Lacs-Burlington High School (DLBHS) is a public high school in Des Lacs, North Dakota that serves students in Burlington as well as Des Lacs. It is part of the United Public School District 7 and was formed from a merger between both of the towns school districts in the late 1960s. Des Lacs-Burlington High School students attend grades K-6 at Burlington-Des Lacs Elementary School in Burlington, and grades 7–12 at DLBHS.

History
The school was formed by a merger of Des Lacs and Burlington High Schools in 1965. Originally, students in grades 7 and 8 attended DLBHS; this changed in 2000 with the addition of a junior high wing at BDLE. In 2017  an education referendum approved funding  for the construction of a junior high school wing at DLBHS. The expansion included a new gymnasium and cafeteria, and was in use by April 2019. The former junior high wing at BDLE was converted into a Kindergarten and office space wing.

Athletics

State championships
 Class 'B' volleyball: 1991
 Class 'B' football: 1993

Administration
North Dakota State Principal of the Year
 2001 - Alton Nygaard - Des Lacs-Burlington High School

North Dakota State Superintendent of the Year
 2000 - Joe Lukach - United Public School District 7
 2007 - Clark Ranum - United Public School District 7
North Dakota Teacher of the Year
 2010 - Mary Elredge-Sandbo, biology teacher

Notable alumni
Jeremy Horst, MLB pitcher

Notes

References

External links
United Public School District 7

Public high schools in North Dakota
North Dakota High School Activities Association (Class B)
Schools in Ward County, North Dakota